Agononida simillima is a species of squat lobster in the family Munididae. The species name is derived from the Latin similis, which refers to its similarity to Agononida normani.

References

Squat lobsters
Crustaceans described in 2006